Mary Whately may refer to:

 Mary Whateley (1738–1825), English poet and playwright
 Mary Louisa Whately (1824–1889), English missionary in Egypt